Sagamore Hill Military Reservation was a coastal defense site located in Sagamore Beach, Massachusetts. Today, the site is the location of Scusset Beach State Reservation.

History
Sagamore Hill Military Reservation was built on state land in 1941-1942 by Battery C, 241st Coast Artillery Regiment of the Massachusetts National Guard, beginning shortly after the attack on Pearl Harbor in December 1941. Its mission was to protect the northern terminus of the Cape Cod Canal from possible naval attack; it was mirrored at the southern entrance by Butler Point Military Reservation. The site had two "Panama mounts" (circular concrete platforms) for two towed 155mm guns. It never fired its guns in defense but did play an important part in the defense of the canal. The reservation was deactivated on 1 April 1945.

The site now
The Panama mounts and battery commander's station of the two-gun 155 mm battery still remain, as well as several magazine "igloos".

See also
 Butler Point Military Reservation
 Seacoast defense in the United States
 United States Army Coast Artillery Corps
 List of military installations in Massachusetts

References

External links
 US Army Corps of Engineers history of the Cape Cod Canal through 1940
 https://web.archive.org/web/20080519224406/http://www.nae.usace.army.mil/recreati/ccc/history/ww2_coastal/ww2coastal.htm (dead link 18 March 2016)
 Williams, Eric, "Guard protected Cape Cod Canal", 11 November 2010, http://capecodonline.com (Cape Cod Times site), retrieved 3 September 2013.
 List of all US coastal forts and batteries at the Coast Defense Study Group, Inc. website
 FortWiki, lists most CONUS and Canadian forts

1941 establishments in Massachusetts
1945 disestablishments in Massachusetts
Bourne, Massachusetts
Buildings and structures in Barnstable County, Massachusetts
Cape Cod Canal
Installations of the U.S. Army in Massachusetts
Military installations established in the 1940s
Military installations closed in 1945